Darcourt is a surname. Notable people with the surname include:
 Guillaume Darcourt (born 1973), French poker player
 José Darcourt (1958–2014), Cuban baseball player
 Juliette Darcourt (1860–1920), French actress and singer
 Lázaro Darcourt (born 1971), Cuban footballer